Montgomery's Inn is a museum in Etobicoke, Toronto, Ontario. Built in 1830 as a Georgian-style inn, it was named for its innkeeper, Thomas Montgomery (1790-1877). Montgomery was an Irish immigrant to Upper Canada, amassing 400 acres of land to the northwest of the city of York, in what is now Etobicoke. 

In 1856, shortly after the death of his wife, Montgomery closed the Inn, but continued to live on the residence.  The Montgomery family would go on to rent the estate as a private farm house until 1946. It was later owned by a Presbyterian church, a developer, the Etobicoke Historical Society, and the Etobicoke Historical Board, until it was finally transferred to the City of Toronto. Once in danger of demolition, it is a cherished remnant of colonial times in Upper Canada. Though most of its current artifacts are not original to the building, they are period pieces, and a few belonged to the Montgomery family and chronicle a chapter in Canadian history.

The Inn is located at 4709 Dundas Street West, on the southeast corner of Islington Avenue and Dundas Street. Named after Henry Dundas, the British secretary of state and war in the Pitt Government, Dundas street was established as link between the town of York and settlements to the west. It would facilitate the transport of civilian and military supplies as well as soldiers if there were an American attack. In the 1830s, the Dundas Highway became a stagecoach route and inns were constructed at various point along the roadway to provide food and lodgings for travelers. One of the inns was Montgomery’s.

Gallery

Farmers' market
A year-round farmers' market is held each Wednesday at the Inn.

See also
 List of oldest buildings and structures in Toronto

References

External links
Montgomery's Inn – Toronto History Museums

Houses completed in 1832
Houses in Toronto
Museums in Toronto
Historic house museums in Ontario
Georgian architecture in Canada
Hotels in Toronto
Etobicoke
Defunct hotels in Canada